Makani Kai Air, was an FAA Part 135 scheduled air carrier based in Honolulu, Hawaii. It was a subsidiary of Schuman Aviation Company as well as Mokulele Airlines,

Overview
The airline offered regularly scheduled passenger service between Honolulu International Airport, Hoolehua Airport, Molokai, Kalaupapa Airport, Molokai, Kahului, Maui and Princeville Airport, Kauai. The scheduled service between Kalaupapa to Hoolehua Airport was among the shortest scheduled flights in the world.

Schuman Aviation Company, Ltd., also offers charter airplane and helicopter services statewide. Another subsidiary, Magnum Helicopters, offers doors-off tours of the island of Oahu.

Makani Kai Air began operations in 1998. It began regularly scheduled passenger service between Honolulu and Kalaupapa in 2009. In 2011, Makani Kai won the Essential Air Service contract for Kalaupapa and commenced service under the contract in January 2012. In June 2013, Makani Kai began regular daily service to "topside" Molokai at the Hoolehua Airport. On May 1, 2019, Makani Kai Air began twice-daily service between Honolulu International Airport and Princeville Airport on Kauai. On August 1, 2019, Makani Kai Air began air service between Kahului, Maui, and Kailua-Kona on the Big Island of Hawaii.

On June 3, 2020, Makani Kai announced it would be merging with Mokulele Airlines, another commuter airline operating in Hawaii, with the new airline operating under the Mokulele brand. Makani Kai owner Richard Schuman oversees the combined airline. Schuman Aviation Company's other subsidiaries, Magnum Helicopters, and Hawaii Aviation Services are not part of the merger.

Destinations

Makanai Kai Air served the following destinations prior to the merger:

Fleet

Accidents and incidents

Accidents and incidents involving the Cessna 208 Caravan

References

Defunct airlines of the United States
Airlines established in 1998
Airlines disestablished in 2020
Companies based in Honolulu
Transportation in Kalawao County, Hawaii